Skinnastaður is a small village in northeastern Iceland, north of Jökulsárgljúfur National Park.

References

Populated places in Northeastern Region (Iceland)